WKYM (101.7 FM) is a radio station  broadcasting a classic rock format. Licensed to Monticello, Kentucky, United States.  The station is currently owned by Stephen W. Staples Jr.

References

External links

KYM
Classic rock radio stations in the United States
1965 establishments in Kentucky
Radio stations established in 1965
Monticello, Kentucky